The 5070th Air Defense Wing is a discontinued United States Air Force organization.  Its last assignment was with the Alaskan Air Command, being stationed at Elmendorf Air Force Base, Alaska.  It was discontinued on 1 October 1961.

History

Lineage
 Designated as the 5070th Air Defense Wing and organized on 1 August 1960
 Discontinued on 1 October 1961

Assignments
 Alaskan Air Command, 1 August 1960 - 1 October 1961

Components
 317th Fighter Interceptor Squadron, 25 August 1960 - 1 October 1961

Stations
 Elmendorf AFB, Alaska,  1 August 1960 - 1 October 1961

Operations
Organized August 1960 after inactivation of 10th Air Division.   Mission was air defense of Alaska south of the Alaska Range.

Discontinued 1 October 1961, with components coming under other AAC units.

See also
 List of MAJCOM wings

References

 Maurer, Maurer (1983). Air Force Combat Units Of World War II. Maxwell AFB, Alabama: Office of Air Force History. .
 Ravenstein, Charles A. (1984). Air Force Combat Wings Lineage and Honors Histories 1947-1977. Maxwell AFB, Alabama: Office of Air Force History. .

Four Digit Wings of the United States Air Force
Air defense wings of the United States Air Force
1960 establishments in Alaska
1961 disestablishments in Alaska
Military units and formations established in 1960
Military units and formations disestablished in 1961